Christina Pickles (born 17 February 1935) is a British actress. She is known for her role as Nurse Helen Rosenthal in the NBC medical drama St. Elsewhere (1982–1988), for which she received five nominations for the Primetime Emmy Award for Outstanding Supporting Actress in a Drama Series. She is also known for her recurring role as Judy Geller on the NBC sitcom Friends (1994, 1996–2003), for which she was nominated for the 1995 Primetime Emmy Award for Outstanding Guest Actress in a Comedy Series.

Pickles appeared in Broadway plays in the 1960s and 1970s, including The Misanthrope (1968) and Sherlock Holmes (1975), and starred on the daytime soap operas Guiding Light (1970–1972, 2007) and Another World (1977–1979). Her film appearances include Masters of the Universe (1987), Legends of the Fall (1994), Romeo + Juliet (1996), and The Wedding Singer (1998). She won the 2018 Primetime Emmy Award for Outstanding Actress in a Short Form Comedy or Drama Series for the Vimeo series Break a Hip.

Early life
Christina Pickles was born in Halifax, West Riding of Yorkshire (now West Yorkshire, the daughter of Arthur Pickles, Liberal politician and Mayor of Halifax, and Gladys (née Crampton) Pickles. She is the niece of radio presenter Wilfred Pickles and the sister of judge James Pickles. Her niece Carolyn Pickles is also an actress.

Christina Pickles began attending the Royal Academy of Dramatic Art in London at age 15 and studied alongside Albert Finney, Peter O’Toole, and Brian Bedford. After graduating, she moved to New York City in the late 1950s, residing initially with friend and classmate Donald Moffat and his wife.

Career
In 1961, Pickles began her acting career in Look Back in Anger at the Arena Stage in Washington, DC. She performed in Measure for Measure in Joe Papp’s Shakespeare in the Park, then won the lead role in George Devine's The Way of the World, despite auditioning for the maid's role. After her Broadway debut in A Severed Head in 1964, other Broadway productions followed, including Inadmissible Evidence, You Can't Take It with You, War and Peace, The Misanthrope, Hamlet, and Sherlock Holmes.

At the same time, Pickles debuted on television, playing Linell Conway on Guiding Light (1970–1972, 2007). She played Countess Elena dePoulignac on the NBC soap opera Another World (1977–1979). She appeared in such feature films as Seizure (1974) and Rush It (1977). After moving from New York City to Los Angeles, Pickles was cast as Nurse Helen Rosenthal in the NBC medical drama St. Elsewhere. The series aired from 1982 to 1988. She remained on St. Elsewhere for its entire six-year run and was nominated for five Primetime Emmy Award for Outstanding Supporting Actress in a Drama Series for her work on the series.

She later was a regular on the short-lived CBS sitcom The People Next Door, which aired in 1989. She went to appear on Family Ties, Who's the Boss?, In the Heat of the Night, Matlock, The Nanny, Murder, She Wrote, and Touched by an Angel.

From 1994 to 2003, Pickles played the recurring role of Judy Geller, the mother of Ross and Monica Geller (David Schwimmer and Courteney Cox), in the NBC sitcom Friends, making appearances throughout the 10-year run of the series. She received a Primetime Emmy Award for Outstanding Guest Actress in a Comedy Series nomination for this role in 1995. Pickles played the mother of Harmon Rabb in the CBS drama series JAG from 1998 to 2000. From 1999 to 2000, she starred in the short-lived Fox comedy-drama series Get Real.

Pickles has appeared in many films, including Masters of the Universe (1987), Revenge of the Nerds IV: Nerds in Love (1994), Legends of the Fall (1994) directed by Edward Zwick, Grace of My Heart (1996), Baz Luhrmann's Romeo + Juliet (1996), The Wedding Singer (1998), Sol Goode (2003),  George of the Jungle 2 (2003), and Atlas Shrugged: Part I (2011). She has had roles in a number of made-for-television movies.

In the 2000s, Pickles appeared in a few episodes of How I Met Your Mother as Lily Aldrin's grandmother, and guest-starred on The Division, Medium, and Childrens Hospital. In 2016, she was cast in the ABC drama pilot The Death Of Eva Sofia Valdez, starring Gina Torres in a title role. In 2018, she received her seventh Emmy nomination (in category for "Outstanding Actress in a Short Form Comedy or Drama Series"), and her first in 23 years, for the comedic web series Break a Hip.

Personal life
Pickles was married to producer/director Victor Lobl for 23 years, divorcing in 1985. She became a United States citizen in 1989. She was romantically linked to actor Herb Edelman, who also played her significant other on St. Elsewhere, from the mid-1980s until his death in 1996.

In 2005, she married Australian-American journalist Ian Masters.

Filmography

Film

Television

Awards and nominations

References

External links

 
 

1935 births
Living people
English emigrants to the United States
Actresses from Yorkshire
English film actresses
English soap opera actresses
English stage actresses
English television actresses
People with acquired American citizenship
American film actresses
American soap opera actresses
American stage actresses
American television actresses
Primetime Emmy Award winners
21st-century American women